Baron Fabian von Fersen (February 7, 1626 – July 30, 1677) was a Swedish general, freelord, field-marshal and governor general of  Skåne, Halland and Blekinge. He served the Swedish Empire in multiple wars and received appointments Field Marshal, and then Governor General of the Scanian lands, which included the provinces of Skåne, Halland and Blekinge in 1676.

Early life

Military career

Death

After his death he was buried in St Mary's Cathedral, Reval (Modern-day Tallinn), where a sarcophagus created by the sculptor Johann Gustav Stockenberg  was erected in his memory.

References

1626 births
1677 deaths
Field marshals of Sweden
Governors-General of Sweden
Swedish nobility
17th-century Swedish military personnel
Swedish people of German descent
17th-century Swedish politicians
Burials at St Mary's Cathedral, Tallinn

Fabian